is a recurring fictional character in Nintendo's The Legend of Zelda series. She is one of the oldest and most frequently recurring characters in the series, having appeared in six titles of The Legend of Zelda games and several spin-off games. She has been redesigned in a variety of forms over the years, but her role has always been to take care of Princess Zelda either as a nursemaid or guardian, and act as a guide to the hero, Link. Impa is also a member of the Sheikah, a mysterious ninja-like group in the lore of the series that is skilled in combat and magic. She first appeared in the instruction manual for the original 1986 action-adventure video game The Legend of Zelda, then made her debut as a major character in the 1998 action-adventure game The Legend of Zelda: Ocarina of Time. She has since appeared in several titles in The Legend of Zelda series, including Oracle of Seasons and Oracle of Ages, Skyward Sword, A Link Between Worlds and Breath of the Wild. She also appears in several spin-off games, including Hyrule Warriors and Cadence of Hyrule. Her most recent appearance was in Hyrule Warriors: Age of Calamity in 2020. Impa has received a positive reception for her representation as a strong female character and also for her role in the narrative and lore of the Zelda series.

Concept and creation
In a foreword to Hyrule Historia, The Legend of Zelda game creator Shigeru Miyamoto revealed the origins of the series, including Impa's role in the game's lore: "Impa, Link, and Zelda were the guardians of the Triforce. Today, when you think of characters who are connected to the Triforce, you think of Link, Zelda, and Ganon, but that started in Ocarina of Time". He also explained that Impa's name originated in her early role as a female storyteller, as her name was taken from the word "impart".

Character design
Impa's character design has evolved significantly over the course of The Legend of Zelda series. She has been depicted in a variety of forms and ages to fulfill various roles in the games. In her first appearance, Impa was created as an elderly woman for the instruction manual of The Legend of Zelda. In Ocarina of Time, she appears as a slimmer, younger character with a sturdy build and hair tied back in a pony tail. By contrast, she was designed as an overweight woman for Oracle of Seasons. In Skyward Sword she appears as younger and older versions of the same character due to the storyline shifting in time and is dressed in the clothing of the Sheikah. The younger version of Impa was given an androgynous appearance. The older version wears a costume that was designed to reflect the passage of time, including a pendulum braid and a triangular robe that becomes a sundial. In Breath of the Wild, she reappears as a much older village elder with a short, shrunken stature. In Hyrule Warriors she is depicted as an athletic warrior, which is similar to her appearance in Ocarina of Time. In Hyrule Warriors: Age of Calamity she is portrayed as a young woman in her twenties who is a powerful fighter and a younger version of the character that appears in Breath of the Wild. Impa's design, abilities, and gestures in Hyrule Warriors: Age of Calamity drew heavy inspiration from Naruto Uzumaki, the eponymous character of the manga Naruto.

Throughout her many incarnations she bears the typical traits of the Sheikah tribe, having white hair and red eyes. She also typically displays the Sheikah symbol, an eye with three triangles above and a teardrop below, on her forehead or clothing. As a representative of her people, she wears the unique garments of the Sheikah, which take inspiration from historical Japanese clothing. As a member of the Sheikah, Impa is highly skilled in combat and in the use of magic.

Portrayal
Impa is voiced by Rei Shimoda in Skyward Sword, and by Aki Nagao in Hyrule Warriors. In Breath of the Wild and Hyrule Warriors: Age of Calamity, Impa is voiced by Shoko Tsuda in Japanese, and Andi Gibson in English. In Cadence of Hyrule, she is voiced by Jo Krasevich.

Characteristics
Impa plays a prevalent role in the lore of The Legend of Zelda series, being a member of the Sheikah tribe, a recurring group of mysterious guardians that protects the Royal Family of Hyrule, particularly Princess Zelda. Impa's main role throughout the series is to mentor Link during gameplay and act as a guardian to Zelda. She plays a divinely ordained role as a member of the Sheikah that extends across the series. In the lore of the series, the Sheikah are commanded by the goddess Hylia to protect Zelda's bloodline. Impa is often significantly older than Zelda and Link so that she can offer her experience as royal advisor.

Appearances

The Legend of Zelda series

Impa is one of the oldest characters in The Legend of Zelda series, having been present at its beginning. She made her first published appearance in 1986 with the release of The Legend of Zelda, which was the original video game in The Legend of Zelda series. Although she does not appear in the video game, she features in The Legend of Zelda Instruction Booklet, in which she acts as a guide to the hero, Link. The manual introduces the storyline of the antagonist Ganon seeking to plunge the world into darkness. To protect Hyrule, Princess Zelda splits the Triforce of Wisdom into eight fragments and hides them throughout the kingdom. She commands her nursemaid, an elderly woman named Impa, to seek out "a man with enough courage to destroy the evil Ganon". When Ganon discovers this, he imprisons Zelda and sends out a search party for Impa. When Impa is cornered by Ganon's henchmen, Link appears and saves her. She tells him about the history of Hyrule and sends him to recover the eight fragments so that he can defeat Ganon.

For the second installment of the series, which is titled Zelda II: The Adventure of Link (1987), Impa reappears in the game instruction book. After Link wakes up with a strange mark on his hand, he seeks out Impa, Zelda's nursemaid, who is "shocked and frightened when she saw the birthmark". She escorts him to a sealed door in the North Castle, known as "the door that does not open". The manual asserts that only the descendants of the Impa family who have served the king know how to open the door. Impa presses Link's left hand to the door, which causes it to open. Behind the door lies Princess Zelda, who has been placed in a magical slumber. Impa recounts the history of Hyrule to Link and gives him six crystals and a scroll that reveals the secrets of the Triforce. She implores Link to save the princess by assembling the Triforce and bringing back peace to Hyrule.

Impa makes her first prominent appearance as a major character in The Legend of Zelda: Ocarina of Time (1998). After Link is sent by the Great Deku Tree to Hyrule Castle and discusses the imminent threat of Ganondorf with Zelda, he meets Impa, who acts as a guide to Link and a protector of Zelda. She helps Zelda to escape before Ganondorf enters the Sacred Realm and obtains the Triforce of Power. In this incarnation, Impa is remarkably different from her previous appearances as the weak old lady and nursemaid to Zelda. She is instead introduced as the last of the Sheikah tribe and the village elder. She also acts as Zelda's bodyguard and mentor. Although she spends little time in gameplay, her influence on the storyline is evident throughout the game. Her role in the narrative is to be the Sage of Shadow, one of the Sages that Link must find in order to defeat Ganondorf.

In the twin titles of The Legend of Zelda: Oracle of Seasons and Legend of Zelda: Oracle of Ages (2001) Impa appears as Zelda's nursemaid and helps her on her adventures in Labrynna and Holodrum, but plays only a minor role in gameplay. In the storyline of Oracle of Seasons, she takes on the disguise of a cook to protect Din, but fails and leaves the mission to Link. In Oracle of Ages, she makes several appearances in the game to help Link find secret passages.

In The Legend of Zelda: Skyward Sword (2011), Impa was reintroduced after a decade to play a major role in the storyline. The game reinforces the importance of the Sheikah in the lore of the series, with Impa being the only representative of the Sheikah in the game. She appears in both a young and old form as the game moves through time. In this incarnation, Impa has a divine mission to travel to her future in order to protect Zelda, who is the reincarnation of the Goddess Hylia, and defeat the main antagonist, the Demon King Demise. At the end of the game, Demise is defeated and trapped inside the Master Sword. After this event, Impa reveals that she is a member of the Sheikah tribe, one of "the goddess's chosen guardians" and that her role is to ensure the safety of the sword and the Triforce and prevent Demise's return. She suggests that her divinely ordained role extends across generations by stating, "You and I will surely meet again someday".

Impa is also present in The Legend of Zelda: A Link Between Worlds (2013). In this game, she reappears as Zelda's nursemaid in 2D form. In the storyline, she is kidnapped and turned into a painting by the main antagonist, Yuga.

Impa plays a major role in the gameplay of The Legend of Zelda: Breath of the Wild (2017). She appears in the form of a village elder and member of the Sheikah tribe who Link encounters upon arrival in Kakariko Village. In this incarnation Impa is a much older, shrunken version of her younger counterpart in Hyrule Warriors: Age of Calamity. Her age is about 121 years, since Link has been asleep for 100 years before the storyline begins. This version of Impa has a granddaughter named Paya, who appears to be roughly the same age as Link. She also has an older sister named Purah, who runs the Hateno Ancient Tech Lab. "Seek Out Impa" is the first major quest line that Link receives after completing the initial starting area on the Great Plateau. She tells Link the story of the four Divine Beasts and helps him to unlock his lost memories of the past. After finding all 12 memories, Link returns to Impa, who reveals the location of Link's last memory. The final memory depicts a cutscene in which Zelda unlocks her powers to protect Link and eventually leads to the player recovering the Master Sword.

Spin-off games and other series 
Impa appears alongside Link and Zelda in one of three Zelda video games released in 1993 for the CD-i, titled Zelda: The Wand of Gamelon. In the storyline, Zelda and Impa travel to Gamelon to search for Link and King Harkinian after they go missing.

Impa makes a major appearance in the hack-and-slash video game Hyrule Warriors (2014) as a playable character. In the storyline, she leads the Elite Guard and has an agile set of acrobatic moves during gameplay as the Hyrulean Captain. During gameplay, she wields a Giant Blade or a naginata. Impa is the first character to be unlocked as a recruit, a trend that is repeated in Hyrule Warriors: Age of Calamity and reflects her status within the franchise.

In Hyrule Warriors: Age of Calamity (2020), Impa appears as a much younger version of the same character that appears in Breath of the Wild, as the game acts as a prequel with events taking place 100 years earlier. Her age can be approximated to about 20, due to a statement in the book titled The Legend of Zelda: Breath of the Wild – Creating a Champion, which asserts that Impa is around 120 years old in Breath Of The Wild. Her role is to be a royal advisor and member of the Sheikah tribe who joins Link and Zelda in their fight against Calamity Ganon. During gameplay, Impa has a unique action that she uses in battle, which involves creating shadow clones of herself to help her to attack surrounding enemies. Her signature weapons include the Kakariko Kodachi, Faithful Kodachi and the Devoted Kodachi. In contrast to her role in earlier games as mentor to Zelda, Age of Calamity changes the dynamic of Impa's relationship with Zelda by making them close friends.

Impa is one of several Zelda characters that was introduced as a playable character in the first DLC pack for the rhythm game Cadence of Hyrule in 2020. She also appears as a Spirit in Super Smash Bros. Ultimate.

Reception
Over the course of her appearances, Impa has received a generally positive reception from critics and fans. She has been the subject of various fan comics, fan art and memes. She has also been praised for her role as a strong female character. Allison Stalberg for The Gamer ranked Impa in tenth place on a list of "The 10 Strongest Women In The Legend Of Zelda Series", commenting that she is a fan-favorite character from the latest Hyrule Warriors: Age of Calamity title. Melody Macready for Screen Rant ranked Impa in eighth place on a list of "10 Most Powerful Female Characters" in The Legend Of Zelda, commenting on her evolution over the years and stating that she is always depicted as a stoic but loyal friend of the royal family who will give her life for Zelda. She also commented on her role as warrior, commenting that "Nintendo would revitalize Impa into Princess Zelda's bodyguard, and she would become a fearsome warrior that would give the Amazons from Wonder Woman a run for their money". Kristy Ambrose for The Gamer ranked Impa in sixth place on a list of "10 Strongest Warriors In RPG History", commenting that Impa is one of the Sheikah people that train as warriors and serve as protectors for the royal family, and Impa is the culmination of that tradition. Clare McBride for SyFy Wire commented on Impa's legacy by stating: "What's fascinating to me about Impa is that she gets to be, well, a little bit of everything over the last 30-odd years. She gets to be the warrior and the respected village elder and the crone" and opined that she "truly understands and values her power and her duty. And to me, that’s the best and greatest measure of a warrior woman".

Impa has also been noted for her role in the narrative of Zelda lore. Sara Heritage for The Gamer ranked Impa in sixth place on a list of every side character in Breath of the Wild, commenting on her role as a member of the Sheikah tribe that has "guided and protected Link and Zelda throughout their adventures". Callum Archer for The Gamer ranked every incarnation of Impa, describing her as an "amazing woman", and considered that her appearance in Skyward Sword is her largest and most important role: "She sends Link to her older self who, in turn, sends him to enhance the Goddess Sword with the three Sacred Flames and turn it into the Master Sword, the blade that would be instrumental in the story of just about every Zelda game in the series canon". Madeline Carpou for Screen Rant also chose Skyward Sword as Impa's standout moment, because she literally transcended time, space, and divinity to protect the princess. Jake Koran for Screen Rant suggested that Impa should be included in downloadable content for Mario Kart 8, due to the fact that she has appeared in many games and has gained increased popularity following the releases of Breath of the Wild and Hyrule Warriors: Age of Calamity. Kyle Gratton for Screen Rant summed up Impa's importance in relation to the other main characters in The Legend of Zelda series, saying that there is the eternal struggle in Zelda's Hyrule Kingdom four characters: Link, Zelda, Ganon, and Impa, who are directly connected to the Goddess Hylia, and are instrumental in every Zelda entry's narrative, practically defining the series in and of themselves.

See also
 Characters of The Legend of Zelda

Notes

References

Female characters in video games
Fictional swordfighters in video games
The Legend of Zelda characters
Nintendo protagonists
Woman soldier and warrior characters in video games
Fictional tribal chiefs
Video game characters introduced in 1986
Video game characters who use magic
Fictional female ninja